Heritage Day is a South African public holiday celebrated on 24 September. On this day, South Africans are encouraged to celebrate their culture and the diversity of their beliefs and traditions, in the wider context of a nation that belongs to all its people.

History

In KwaZulu-Natal, 24 September was known as Shaka Day for most people, in commemoration of Shaka, the Zulu king of southern Africa, on the presumed date of his death on this date 1828. Shaka played an important role in uniting the disparate Zulu clans into cohesive nations. Each year people gather at the Shaka Memorial to honor him on this day. The Public Holidays Bill presented to the post-Apartheid Parliament of South Africa in 1996 did not include 24 September on the list of proposed public holidays. As a result of this exclusion, the Inkatha Freedom Party (IFP), a South African political party with a large Zulu membership, objected to the bill. Parliament and the ANC reached a compromise and the day was given its present title and accepted as a public holiday now known as heritage day:

Celebration 

South Africans celebrate the day by remembering the cultural heritage of the many cultures that make up the population of South Africa. Various events are staged throughout the country such as braai to commemorate/remember this day.

Former Western Cape Provincial Premier Ebrahim Rasool addressed the public at a Heritage Day celebration at the Gugulethu Heritage trail in 2007 in Gugulethu. In Hout Bay, there is an army procession and a recreation of the battle fought there.

In 2005, Jan Scannell (known as "Jan Braai") started a media campaign proposing that the holiday will be renamed as a National Braai Day, in commemoration of the culinary tradition of informal backyard barbecues, known as braais. On 5 September 2007, Archbishop Desmond Tutu celebrated his appointment as patron of South Africa's Braai Day, affirming it to be a unifying force in a divided country (by donning an apron and enthusiastically eating a boerewors sausage). In 2008, the initiative received the endorsement of South Africa's National Heritage Council. Scannell said that the aim is to hold small events with friends and family, and not to have a mass braai. The holiday is celebrated by wearing traditional clothes.

References

External links 
 Heritage Day 2020 at the South African Government website
 National Braai Day

Public holidays in South Africa
September observances
South African culture
Spring (season) events in South Africa